Divine Council was an American rap group originating from Richmond, Virginia. They were made up of artists Cyrax!, ICYTWAT, Lord Linco and $ILKMONEY who was named to Rolling Stone's "10 New Artists You Need to Know" in 2016. The group's single "P. Sherman (PS42WW$)" peaked at #1 on the Billboard Spotify Viral 50 chart in May 2016, with the release of their Gold debut EP in August that same year.

History

The idea for Divine Council started with Virginia-based rapper Lord Linco. He was then joined by Cyrax! and $ILKMONEY, two other Virginia-based rappers. The group released several tracks including Shorty and FOOLIE with most of the group's production handled by ICYTWAT. The group then gained recognition in the underground hip-hop scene and amassed a large following on social media.

Divine Council played local gigs around the Richmond area prior to getting a New York show for CMJ's "Leaders of the New Cool" artist showcase in October 2015, founded by Chris Turner & Dominique Maldonado of Hollywood East ENT . In New York, they met André 3000 who introduced himself as a fan of the group. Divine Council managed by Chris Turner & Dominique Maldonado later signed with Epic Records with André 3000's endorsement. The group played SXSW and Rolling Loud in 2016 and released their debut EP on Epic Records in August that same year.

In September 2017, ICYTWAT stated that he was no longer a member of Divine Council and hasn't been actively a part of the group since July, he has also stated that Cyrax! and $ILKMONEY are the only remaining members of Divine Council although this hasn't been confirmed by either member.

Later in 2017 Linco confirmed his departure from the group on Instagram Live, stating he and ICYTWAT remain close friends. Linco stated his departure had to do with a girl he fell in love with and should not have, admitting his group mates were right all along. ICYTWAT's departure from Divine Council remains a mystery and he has avoided the question in interviews but neither has removed their DB$B tattoos. $ILKMONEY talked about Linco's departure on the song "BAF" off his solo album, I Hate My Life And I Really Wish People Would Stop Telling Me Not To, stating that he still views him as a brother and their feud does nothing for either party. Cyrax! has remained silent on the matter, but wishes his former group mates well in their respective careers.

Sometime in 2018, Divine Council was dropped by Epic records, with several tracks and their debut album all going unreleased. Only small leaks are available online. Some suggest it had to do with Linco and ICYTWAT leaving the group, while some claim it was a mutual departure on both sides.

As of April 2020, Cyrax! and $ILKMONEY have both released solo projects that have been well received by the fans, with the idea of carrying on the Divine Council name. Since leaving Divine Council, Lord Linco changed his name to Loveybone and released a solo album. His career has been strained by frequent stints in prison since 2018. ICYTWAT has enjoyed a solo career as well being co-signed by ASAP Rocky and Playboi Carti.

There are no public plans of an album or group reunion, however ICYTWAT has stated he would be interested in returning under the right circumstances.

ICYTWAT has the letters DB$B tattooed on his right hand. In August 2022 ICYTWAT posted pictures to twitter and Tumblr showing his updated hand tattoos. The new photos show both B's and the D is DB$B have been crossed out with a red X. The $ still remains.

Discography

EP's

Singles

Cyrax' Discography

$ilkmoney's Discography

Lord Linco's Discography (Past Member)

ICYTWAT'S Discography (Past Member)

References

External links
 

American rappers
Epic Records artists
Musical groups from Virginia